Gboguhé is a town in western Ivory Coast. It is a sub-prefecture and commune of Daloa Department in Haut-Sassandra Region, Sassandra-Marahoué District.

In 2014, the population of the sub-prefecture of Gboguhé was 58,103.

Villages
The 36 villages of the sub-prefecture of Gboguhé and their population in 2014 are:

Notes

Sub-prefectures of Haut-Sassandra
Communes of Haut-Sassandra